Java plum is a common name for the edible fruits of several tropical tree species, and may refer to:

Syzygium cumini, native to India and southeast Asia
Spondias mombin, native to the tropical Americas